Arasay María Thondike Santovenia (also spelled Thondique or Tondike; born 28 May 1986 in Sagua La Grande, Villa Clara) is a female hammer thrower from Cuba. She set a personal best throw of 71.14 metres in June 2007 in Warsaw. This personal best stood for two years until she significantly improved upon it with a throw of 71.72 m at the Barrientos Memorial in Cuba.

Biography
She finished seventh at the 2003 World Youth Championships, won the silver medal at the 2007 Pan American Games, finished ninth at the 2007 World Championships and fifth at the 2007 World Athletics Final. She also competed at the 2008 Olympic Games without reaching the final.

Personal best
Hammer throw: 73.90 m –  La Habana, 18 July 2009

Achievements

References

External links

granma.cubaweb

Ecured biography (in Spanish)
 

1986 births
Living people
Cuban female hammer throwers
Athletes (track and field) at the 2007 Pan American Games
Athletes (track and field) at the 2008 Summer Olympics
Athletes (track and field) at the 2011 Pan American Games
Athletes (track and field) at the 2012 Summer Olympics
Olympic athletes of Cuba
Pan American Games medalists in athletics (track and field)
Pan American Games silver medalists for Cuba
Medalists at the 2007 Pan American Games
People from Sagua la Grande